Gallery of Modern Art may refer to:

 Galleria d'Arte Moderna, Bologna, Italy
 Gallery of Modern Art, Brisbane, Australia
 Gallery of Modern Art, Florence, Italy, housed in the Palazzo Pitti
 Gallery of Modern Art, Glasgow, Scotland, UK
 Gallery of Modern Art, New York City, which operated 1964–1969 in the building known as 2 Columbus Circle
 Washington Gallery of Modern Art, former gallery in Washington, D.C.

See also
 Galleria Comunale d'Arte Moderna, Rome
 Museum of Modern Art (disambiguation) 
 National Gallery of Modern Art (disambiguation)